Camillina europaea is a species of spider in the genus Camillina found in Italy.

References

Gnaphosidae
Spiders of Europe
Spiders described in 1922